Kenny De Ketele (born 5 June 1985) is a Belgian former professional racing cyclist, who rode professionally between 2007 and 2021, entirely for UCI ProTeam . He won eight medals at the UCI Track Cycling World Championships, including a gold medal in the Madison at the 2012 UCI Track Cycling World Championships, partnering Gijs Van Hoecke.

Major results

Track

2002
 2nd Individual pursuit, National Junior Championships
2003
 National Junior Championships
1st  Individual pursuit
1st  Points race
2nd Scratch
3rd Kilo
 2nd  Points race, UEC European Junior Championships
2004
 1st  Madison, UEC European Under-23 Championships (with Iljo Keisse)
 National Championships
1st  Individual pursuit
1st  Kilo
 UIV Cup U23
1st Ghent (with Steve Schets)
2nd Amsterdam (with Steve Schets)
2nd Munich (with Steve Schets)
2005
 National Championships
1st  Madison (with Steve Schets)
2nd Omnium
 2nd  Madison, 2004–05 UCI Track Cycling World Cup Classics, Manchester (with Wouter Van Mechelen)
 2nd  Madison, UEC European Under-23 Championships (with Steve Schets)
 2nd Overall UIV Cup U23 (with Steve Schets)
1st Munich
2nd Bremen
2nd Berlin
3rd Copenhagen
 3rd  Madison, 2005–06 UCI Track Cycling World Cup Classics, Moscow (with Steve Schets)
2006
 1st  Madison, UEC European Under-23 Championships (with Steve Schets)
 National Championships
1st  Kilo
1st  Team pursuit (with Steve Schets, Ingmar De Poortere and Tim Mertens)
2nd Individual pursuit
3rd Omnium
2007
 UEC European Under-23 Championships
1st  Points race
3rd  Team pursuit
 National Championships
1st  Points race
1st  Derny
2nd Scratch
3rd Individual pursuit
 2nd  Madison, 2006–07 UCI Track Cycling World Cup Classics, Los Angeles (with Steve Schets)
2008
 1st  Madison, 2007–08 UCI Track Cycling World Cup Classics, Los Angeles (with Tim Mertens)
 National Championships
1st  Derny
1st  Team pursuit (with Ingmar De Poortere, Tim Mertens and Dominique Cornu)
1st  Madison (with Iljo Keisse)
1st  Kilo
1st  Omnium
2nd Points race
2nd Individual pursuit
3rd Scratch
 2nd  Madison, 2008–09 UCI Track Cycling World Cup Classics, Manchester (with Iljo Keisse)
 2nd Six Days of Fiorenzuola (with Iljo Keisse)
 2nd Six Days of Hasselt (with Iljo Keisse)
 3rd Six Days of Ghent (with Andreas Beikirch)
2009
 1st  Madison, 2009–10 UCI Track Cycling World Cup Classics, Manchester (with Tim Mertens)
 1st  Derny, UEC European Track Championships
 1st Six Days of Hasselt (with Bruno Risi)
 3rd Six Days of Berlin (with Roger Kluge)
2010
 2nd  Madison, UEC European Championships (with Tim Mertens)
 2nd Six Days of Ghent (with Leif Lampater)
2011
 1st  Madison, UEC European Championships (with Iljo Keisse)
 1st Six Days of Ghent (with Robert Bartko)
2012
 UCI World Championships
1st  Madison (with Gijs Van Hoecke)
3rd  Points race
 1st Six Days of Zürich (with Peter Schep)
 2nd  Madison, 2011–12 UCI Track Cycling World Cup, Beijing (with Tim Mertens)
 2nd Six Days of Ghent (with Gijs Van Hoecke)
 3rd Six Days of Berlin (with Iljo Keisse)
2013
 1st Six Days of Amsterdam (with Gijs Van Hoecke)
 International Belgian Open
1st Madison (with Jasper De Buyst)
1st Points race
 2nd  Madison, 2013–14 UCI Track Cycling World Cup, Aguascalientes (with Jasper De Buyst)
 2nd Six Days of Berlin (with Luke Roberts)
 2nd Six Days of Zürich (with Jasper De Buyst)
 3rd  Madison, UEC European Championships (with Gijs Van Hoecke)
 3rd  Team pursuit, 2012–13 UCI Track Cycling World Cup, Glasgow
 3rd Six Days of Ghent (with Gijs Van Hoecke)
2014
 1st Six Days of Berlin (with Andreas Müller)
 1st Six Days of Ghent (with Jasper De Buyst)
 International Belgian Open
1st Madison (with Roy Pieters)
2nd Points race
 2nd  Madison, 2013–14 UCI Track Cycling World Cup, Guadalajara (with Jasper De Buyst)
 2nd  Points race, 2014–15 UCI Track Cycling World Cup, London
 2nd  Madison, UEC European Championships (with Otto Vergaerde)
 2nd Six Days of Rotterdam (with Jasper De Buyst)
 3rd Six Days of Zürich (with Jasper De Buyst)
2015
 1st  Derny, UEC European Track Championships
 1st Six Days of London (with Moreno De Pauw)
 2nd Six Days of Berlin (with David Muntaner)
 2nd Six Days of Ghent (with Gijs Van Hoecke)
 3rd Madison, International Belgian Open (with Jules Hesters)
2016
 2016–17 UCI Track Cycling World Cup
1st  Madison, Apeldoorn (with Robbe Ghys)
2nd  Team pursuit, Apeldoorn
3rd  Madison, Glasgow (with Moreno De Pauw)
 1st  Madison, National Championships (with Moreno De Pauw)
 1st Six Days of Amsterdam (with Moreno De Pauw)
 1st Six Days of Berlin (with Moreno De Pauw)
 1st Six Days of Bremen (with Christian Grasmann)
 1st Six Days of London (with Moreno De Pauw)
 UEC European Championships
2nd  Points race
3rd  Madison (with Moreno De Pauw)
 2nd Six Days of Copenhagen (with Moreno De Pauw)
 2nd Six Days of Ghent (with Moreno De Pauw)
 3rd  Points race, UCI World Championships
2017
 2017–18 UCI Track Cycling World Cup
1st  Madison, Milton (with Lindsay De Vylder)
2nd  Madison, Pruszków (with Moreno De Pauw)
3rd  Points race, Milton
 1st Six Days Final – Mallorca (with Moreno De Pauw)
 1st Six Days of Ghent (with Moreno De Pauw)
 UCI World Championships
2nd  Points race
3rd  Madison with Moreno De Pauw)
 2nd Six Days of Berlin (with Moreno De Pauw)
 2nd Six Days of Copenhagen (with Moreno De Pauw)
 3rd Six Days of London (with Moreno De Pauw)
2018
 UEC European Championships
1st  Madison (with Robbe Ghys)
2nd  Points race
 1st Six Days of Bremen (with Theo Reinhardt)
 1st Six Days of Copenhagen (with Michael Mørkøv)
 1st Six Days of Rotterdam (with Moreno De Pauw)
 2nd  Team pursuit, 2018–19 UCI Track Cycling World Cup, London
 2nd Six Days of Berlin (with Moreno De Pauw)
 2nd Six Days of Ghent (with Robbe Ghys)
2019
 1st Six Days of Copenhagen (with Moreno De Pauw)
 1st Six Days of Ghent (with Robbe Ghys)
 1st Hong Kong, 2018–19 Six Day Series (with Yoeri Havik)
 3rd  Madison, UCI World Championships (with Robbe Ghys)
2020
 1st Six Days of Bremen (with Nils Politt)
2021
 1st Six Days of Ghent (with Robbe Ghys)
 UCI World Championships
2nd  Points race
3rd  Madison (with Robbe Ghys)
 2nd  Madison, UEC European Championships (with Lindsay De Vylder)

Road

2003
 2nd Junior Tour of Flanders
 2nd Junior Trofee der Vlaamse Ardennen
2005
 2nd Overall Ronde van Vlaams-Brabant
 3rd Kaarst-Büttgen
2006
 9th Overall Triptyque des Barrages
2007
 3rd GP Frans Melckenbeeck
 7th Overall Giro del Capo
2011
 1st  Sprints classification Vuelta a Burgos
2015
 7th Grand Prix Criquielion
2018
 9th Overall Rás Tailteann

References

External links

1985 births
Living people
People from Oudenaarde
Belgian male cyclists
Olympic cyclists of Belgium
Cyclists at the 2008 Summer Olympics
Cyclists at the 2012 Summer Olympics
Cyclists at the 2020 Summer Olympics
UCI Track Cycling World Champions (men)
Cyclists from East Flanders
Belgian track cyclists